The Trochidae, common name top-snails or top-shells, are a family of various sized sea snails, marine gastropod molluscs in the subclass Vetigastropoda. This family is commonly known as the top-snails because in many species the shell resembles a toy spinning top.

Taxonomy 
The family Trochidae consists of the following subfamilies:
 Alcyninae Williams, Donald, Spencer & Nakano, 2010
 Cantharidinae Gray, 1857
 Carinotrochinae S.-Q. Zhang, J. Zhang & S.-P. Zhang, 2020
 Chrysostomatinae Williams, Donald, Spencer & Nakano, 2010
 Fossarininae Bandel, 2009
 Halistylinae Keen, 1958
 Kaiparathininae B. A. Marshall, 1993
 Monodontinae Gray, 1857
 Stomatellinae Gray, 1840

Trochinae Rafinesque, 1815
Umboniinae H. Adams & A. Adams, 1854 (1840)
Additionally, the following genera have not yet been placed in any subfamily:

 Callumbonella Thiele, 1924
 †Coeloconulus Nützel, 2012 
 Enida A. Adams, 1860
 †Eocalliostoma O. Haas, 1953 
 †Fagnastesia S. N. Nielsen, Frassinetti & Bandel, 2004 
 †Falsotectus Gründel, Keupp & Lang, 2017 

 †Guidonia De Stefani, 1880 
 †Lithotrochus Conrad, 1855 
 †Tylotrochus Koken, 1896

Description

Shell 
The length of an adult shell varies between 5 mm and 130 mm. There is also a wide variation in the shape of the shell. This goes from low auriform (ear-shaped) with a wide aperture to the long, slender conical forms of typical top shells. The shape may also be subglobose, turbinate or helicoid. Their height may vary between 3 mm and 152 mm. The shell contains only a few whorls. These have a highly variable exterior, ranging from smooth or glossy to sculptured.

The internal shell is nacreous. They have a brown, entirely corneous, circular, multispiral operculum which fits the aperture snugly. The operculum is formed of numerous gradually increasing whorls with a central nucleus. The aperture may be entire, tetragonal or rounded and has no reflected lip. The peristome is generally not continuous.

These shells are often brightly colored and adorned with darker bands.

Species of the family Trochidae differ from those in the family Turbinidae in having a corneous, never calcareous, operculum, which is always multispiral.

Internal anatomy 
The animal is similar in general form to the Turbinidae. The top snails are characterized by some primitive traits: a heart with two atria. They have retained only one kidney and the second osphradium has been lost in the course of evolution. The mantle cavity contains a single gill.

Along the side of the foot are three or more pairs of sensory epipodial tentacles. The head has a short, broad rostrum. The intertentacular lobes are simple or digitated, separate or united across the front, sometimes obsolete. The jaws are developed or absent.

The radula is rhipidoglossate. The rhachidian teeth are always present and well-developed. The lateral teeth generally number 5 on each side, sometimes more numerous. The marginal teeth are narrow and very numerous.

Distribution and habitat 
This family has a worldwide distribution in tropical, temperate and arctic waters. Members of this family are among the most common marine snails along the rocky shores of Europe. Most species in the family live either in the intertidal zone or in the shallow subtidal zone, but some live in deeper water. They are usually abundant on solid, suitable substrates, like rocky shores and reefs.

Ecology

Life cycle
Species of the family Trochidae are dioecious, and the fertilization occurs externally by the release of eggs and sperm. Top snail eggs are laid individually or in gelatinous egg masses in the water. Individuals may hatch as free-swimming planktonic larvae or juvenile crawlers with a short swimming stage.

Feeding behavior
This family of snails consists of herbivores, grazing with their radulae on rocky surfaces, feeding on algae and vegetable detritus, and more rarely by filter-feeding, as observed in the genus Umbonium.

References
 Williams S.T., Donald K.M., Spencer H.G. & Nakano T. (2010) Molecular systematics of the marine gastropod families Trochidae and Calliostomatidae (Mollusca: Superfamily Trochoidea). Molecular Phylogenetics and Evolution 54:783-809

External links 
 Miocene Gastropods and Biostratigraphy of the Kern River Area, California; United States Geological Survey Professional Paper 642 

 
Trochoidea (superfamily)
Taxa named by Constantine Samuel Rafinesque